The Dutch Eerste Divisie in the 1994–95 season was contested by 18 teams. Fortuna Sittard won the championship.

New entrants
Relegated from the Eredivisie 1993–94
 Cambuur Leeuwarden
 VVV-Venlo

League standings

Promotion/relegation play-offs
In the promotion/relegation competition, eight entrants (six from this league and two from the Eredivisie) entered in two groups. The group winners were promoted to the Eredivisie.

See also
 Eredivisie 1994–95
 KNVB Cup 1994–95

References
Netherlands – List of final tables (RSSSF)

Eerste Divisie seasons
2
Neth